Argyrochosma microphylla, the small-leaf false cloak fern, is a species of fern native to New Mexico, Texas and northern Mexico. It grows on limestone rocks and cliffs, and has finely-divided leaves with small leaf segments, often folded in half when dry, which lack the white powder present on the leaf underside of many related species. First described as a species in 1869, it was transferred to the new genus Argyrochosma (the "false cloak ferns") in 1987, recognizing their distinctness from the "cloak ferns" (Notholaena sensu stricto).

Description
The rhizome is short and horizontal, with leaves closely spaced. It bears thin, narrowly lanceolate or linear brown to dark orange, chestnut-brown, or reddish-brown scales , of a uniform color and with entire (toothless) margins.

The stipe (the stalk of the leaf, below the blade) is rounded, somewhat flattened or grooved on the upper surface, reddish-brown to dark brown, or chestnut brown, usually darker at the base, without hairs or scales except for a few scales like those of the rhizome at the very base. They vary from deltate (triangular) to ovate in shape, and range from tripinnate (cut into pinnae, pinnules and pinnulets) to quadripinnate at the base, where the leaf blade is most divided; it becomes merely bipinnate near the tip. The leaf blade is truncate (abruptly terminating), at the base and is acute (pointed) to acuminate at the tip. The rachis (leaf axis) is flattened or shallowly grooved above, straight or somewhat zig-zagging, and dark in color (though lighter than the stipe), as are the axes of the leaf segments. The color stops abruptly at a joint at the base of the leaf segment. There are 5 to 9 pairs of pinnae, alternating along the rachis or nearly opposite, and abruptly contracting in width near the tip. The costae (pinna axes) are straight to somewhat zig-zagging; when the latter, they typically do not branch at the angles. Leaf segments are orbicular (circular) to cordate (heart-shaped). They appear narrow or triangular when dry and curled, and are borne on small stalks. The leaf tissue is gray-green and leathery, obscuring the veins from the upper surface, and does not bear hairs or scales on either surface. Unlike many species in the genus, farina (powder) is not present on either surface of the leaf, although both surfaces are glaucous.

In fertile leaf segments, the sporangia are close to the margin, borne along the further third of the secondary veins branching from the midrib of the segment. Each sporangium contains 64 spores. The leaf segments are bent or curled under, often concealing the sporangia. The curled tissue retains the same texture as the rest of the leaf, and is not modified into a false indusium. Fertile segments often fold along their long axis. A. microphylla is a sexual diploid, with a chromosome count of 2n = 54.

The small leaf segments and shallow groove on the rachis make A. microphylla distinct from other species in the genus. The zig-zag character of the rachis in some specimens resembles A. fendleri, but the latter bears farina, and the smaller axes zig-zag as well. Of the other North American taxa lacking farina, A. formosa has somewhat larger leaf segments and a dark, straight rachis without a groove, while A. jonesii and A. lumholtzii lack the distinct joint at the base of the leaf, and do not have dramatically folded leaf segments when dry.

Taxonomy
The species was first described in 1869 as Pellaea microphylla by Max Kuhn, who was presenting material the herbarium left behind by the late Georg Heinrich Mettenius. He used Mettenius' name for the species, which had been collected in New Mexico by Charles Wright in 1849 and had heretofore been lumped with P. pulchella. The rationale for the epithet microphylla, meaning "small-leaved", was not given. Hooker & Baker, in their second edition of Synopsis Filicum (1874), treated it as P. pulchella var. microphylla.

Rolla M. Tryon Jr., when finishing Charles Alfred Weatherby's revision of American Notholaena, transferred the species there under the replacement name of N. parvifolia, the name N. microphylla being preoccupied. He chose the epithet parvifolia, which also means "small-leaved", to reflect the meaning of the original epithet.  While Tryon considered it impossible to reasonably subdivide Notholaena into sections based on the data available at the time, both Edwin Copeland and Weatherby himself had suggested in the 1940s that a group of ferns related to N. nivea might represent a distinct genus. John T. Mickel, following Copeland's opinion that Notholaena was best lumped into a broadly defined Cheilanthes, transferred the species there as C. parviflora in 1979.

The recognition of the N. nivea group as a genus was finally addressed in 1987 by Michael D. Windham, who was carrying out phylogenetic studies of these genera. He elevated Notholaena sect. Argyrochosma to become the genus Argyrochosma, and transferred this species to that genus as A. microphylla. In 2018, Maarten J. M. Christenhusz transferred the species to Hemionitis as H. vooshvazool , as part of a program to consolidate the cheilanthoid ferns into that genus. The epithet refers to the nighthob messenger Vooshvazool in the novel The Neverending Story. 

Phylogenetic studies have shown that A. microphylla is a sister species to A. formosa; these two species form a clade sister to another clade containing A. jonesii and A. lumholtzii. All four species lack farina, and their common ancestor is hypothesized to have diverged from the ancestor of the rest of the genus before farina production developed in the latter.

Distribution and habitat
Argyrochosma microphylla is known in the United States from southeastern New Mexico and Trans-Pecos Texas, with outlying stations as far as Brazos County, Texas and Bernalillo County, New Mexico. In Mexico, it ranges across the northern states from Sonora to Nuevo León and south into Zacatecas. 

Cultivation
It prefers high light, and moist-dry, well-drained garden soil with sand, perhaps of high pH.

Notes and references

References

Works cited

External links
Isotype of the species at JSTOR Plant Science.

microphylla
Ferns of Mexico
Ferns of the United States
Flora of New Mexico
Flora of Northeastern Mexico
Flora of Sonora
Flora of Texas
Flora of the Sonoran Deserts
Plants described in 1869